Events in the year 2020 in Jordan.

Incumbents
Monarch – Abdullah II

Events
March 2 – First case of the COVID-19 pandemic in Jordan.
March 12 – 15 – 2020 Middle East storms.

Predicted and Scheduled Events
November - 2020 Jordanian general election.

Deaths

References

 
2020s in Jordan
Years of the 21st century in Jordan
Jordan